The Return is the 48th book in the Animorphs series, written by K. A. Applegate. It is known to have been ghostwritten by Kimberly Morris. Due to an editorial oversight, Lisa Harkrader was mistakenly credited with writing the book. It is the last book (fully) narrated by Rachel. It is the fourth of the last ten books to have an inverted title, in which the main title is in color and the background of the title is in black, showing a definite change.

Plot summary
The book begins with a cold open into Rachel's dream-within-a-dream to give the impression of reality; the Animorphs are taking a tour of the White House just as the Yeerks launch an attack. Hork-Bajir and Taxxons try to prevent the President from being airlifted away from the scene, but Rachel attacks them and lets the helicopter fly off. Jake approaches her and tells her that he had already told her to de-morph and stay out of the fight, as she was badly injured, but Rachel tells him not to tell her what to do. They have a brief fight for superiority, and Rachel is defeated as she is bleeding to death, however immediately awakens (at the time, believing she has actually awoken from the whole dream) screaming after thinking a stream of blood rather than sweat is running down her cheek.

Following this are a succession of events in the dream, including: Marco, Ax, Tobias, and Rachel at Ax's scoop discussing their current situation and the Yeerks' plans, as well as stories appearing on the Internet of first-hand accounts of Yeerk battles (which Rachel notes as actually happening in the real world) and Rachel feeling victimized and set apart by the others for her opinions; Tobias and Rachel flying over the forest, further talking about Rachel's attitude to battle, with Tobias clarifying that "I don't think anyone really understands where you're coming from." Rachel then finally wakes for school, and attends but feels disillusioned and disconnected from everyone and everything; asking Cassie to meet her after school at her farm, Rachel walks to Cassie's barn but is set upon by a large pack of rats, as is Cassie.

It is eventually revealed that this strange event was a manipulation of reality by Crayak, the recurring red light in her dreams and at school. With the help of Crayak, David, the boy who betrayed the Animorphs after being recruited to the team, has returned for revenge on Rachel after she trapped him in rat form (explaining the recurrence of rats earlier). As part of the manipulation of (but still) reality, Rachel awakens in a small cube underground, and David is set in front of her outside the cube by two teenagers. He brags to her about commanding an army of rats to escape from the island, climbing into a boat which belonged to scientists counting the bird population, and doing all sorts of deeds for him once making it back to the mainland, including swarming Rachel and Cassie at her farm. He also claims to have stolen hundreds of thousands of dollars since being trapped as a rat by getting into places no human can. He says this is how he has bribed the two teenagers to bring him to Rachel. He also brags and tries to manipulate and sway Rachel, telling her she is a bully for what she did to him, and showing her a locked-up Cassie and forcing Rachel to morph to rat to become a nothlit like him or Cassie will suffocate. Soon Crayak arrives, and Rachel concludes that David has for the most part been lying about his exploits, and he admits he has, and that he has been brought to her by Crayak. The Drode, who has accompanied Crayak, reveals, however, that David's desire for revenge is not their reason for appearing to Rachel.

Crayak intimidates Rachel and shows her what she could be (a far more powerful, taller version of herself with retractable metal claws and all kinds of advanced reflexes) if she accepts his offer to be a leader and stop the Yeerk invasion of Earth; all she has to do is kill Jake. She says "I am one of the good guys," but Crayak tries to sway her by switching her between her rat morph (fighting with David) and "Super-Rachel". He then brings Visser One to her, and they fight, with Rachel triumphing until Crayak switches realities again as Rachel refuses to eliminate him. He and the Drode eventually disappear, calling her a fool and a coward, and insisting she is weak for not living up to her potential.

Rachel appears back in rat morph, but convinces the two teenagers, offering them David's fake stashed cash as a reward, to free her just in time for her to de-morph. They escape when she morphs to grizzly to scare them. David also tries escaping, and Rachel frees Cassie, but tells her to leave without her, telling her she is going after David. Ultimately failing to escape after Rachel follows him, David finds himself in Rachel's clutches again and he begs her to kill him, insisting putting him back on the island would be a fate worse than death. David's ultimate fate is unexplained.

New morphs

Super-Rachel, the alligator, and the carnivorous plant-like creature are not actual creatures whose DNA Rachel acquires, but rather creatures that she is able to morph by willing them into existence due to a temporary power bestowed by Crayak. Also, when Cassie tried to get away from the rats, she was said to be morphing. It is unknown what she was morphing.

Trivia
The cover quote is, "The sixth Animorph is back, and he's not happy..."
The inside cover quote is, "Rachel's really hit the big time..."
Of the six Animorphs, only Rachel and Cassie appear in any real-time events.  Jake, Tobias, Marco, and Ax appear in Rachel's nightmares, but are otherwise absent from the book.
Rachel has recurring dreams where she simultaneously respects and hates Jake for being the leader of the Animorphs and ordering him around, and has a nightmare of maiming him to establish dominance, only to lose and be killed for her troubles.
Crayak and the Drode, who developed a fascination with Rachel during the events of #27: The Exposed and wished to have her kill Jake for them, rescue David from his marooned island. Rachel is pitted against him and, later, Visser One, with Crayak granting Rachel power in exchange for Jake's life. When Rachel refuses, Crayak and the Drode make their leave, discarding their interest in Rachel and their deal with David.
David begs Rachel to end his life, citing it to be more humane than leaving him marooned once again. Rachel notices a mirror shard and breaks down in tears, before making her decision. Although the decision is not shown and is never expressly revealed for the rest of the series, it is implied, but not confirmed, that she murdered David.

2000 novels
Animorphs books
2000 science fiction novels